The Bavarian Alps  is a collective name for several mountain ranges of the Northern Limestone Alps within the German state of Bavaria.

Geography

The term in its wider sense refers to that part of the Eastern Alps that lies on Bavarian state territory. However, it is traditionally understood that the Bavarian Alps are only those ranges between the rivers Lech and Saalach (Altbayern). In this narrower sense, the Allgäu Alps in Swabia, which have only been part of Bavaria in more recent times, and the Berchtesgaden Alps in the east are not considered part of the Bavarian Alps.

The term is frequently used, but does not correspond to the common classification of the Eastern Alps (AVE) developed by the German, Austrian and South Tyrol Alpine Clubs. It should not be confused with the term Bavarian Prealps either. The latter only covers the Bavarian section of the Prealps between the River Loisach in the west and the River Inn in the east.

According to the Italian Partizione Delle Alpi classification, the Bavarian Alps (Alpi Bavaresi) comprise the Allgäu and Lechtal Alps as well as the adjacent Achen Lake mountains.

Notable summits
The Bavarian Alps in their broader sense include the following parts of the mountain ranges listed − in this tabular overview sorted according to AVE roughly from west to east and with maximum heights above sea level (NN). The highest peaks and elevations shown relate to that part of the mountain group that lies in Bavaria, and not to the overall group.

The highest peak in the Bavarian Alps and in Germany as a whole is the Zugspitze.

By clicking on the word "List" in the various rows of the Lists column, a list other mountains in the particular range may be viewed (noting that some of them will be outside Bavaria or the Bavarian Alps). The table may be sorted by clicking on the sort symbols in the column headers.

Landscape
Like the Alps as a whole, the Bavarian Alps as part of the Northern Limestone Alps were heavily influenced by the last ice age. Cirques, lakes and typical U-shaped valleys were formed by the glaciers. Depositions by ice age rivers and glaciers left behind a gently rolling landscape in the Alpine Foreland with lakes and bogs.

References

Sources
 DAV. Alpenvereins-Jahrbuch, "Berg '84": Die Einteilung der Ostalpen
 Bogner Franz X. (2011). Die deutschen Alpen aus der Luft. Rosenheimer Verlag, .

External links

 Tour descriptions for the Bavarian Alps

 
Mountain ranges of the Alps
Alps
Mountain ranges of Bavaria

pt:Pré-Alpes bávaros